Marko Simonovski (born 2 January 1992) is a Macedonian footballer who plays as a forward for Kosovan club Drita.

Club career
On 23 February 2016, Simonovski signed for Kazakhstan Premier League side FC Zhetysu. On 5 July 2016, Simonovski joined FC Shakhter Karagandy.

International career
He made his senior debut for Macedonia in a December 20102 friendly match against Poland and has earned a total of 3 caps, scoring no goals. His final international was a June 2014 friendly against China.

Career statistics

References

External links
 
 
 Profile at Macedonian Football 
 

1992 births
Living people
Footballers from Skopje
Association football forwards
Macedonian footballers
North Macedonia youth international footballers
North Macedonia under-21 international footballers
North Macedonia international footballers
FK Metalurg Skopje players
FK Napredok players
FC Amkar Perm players
RNK Split players
FC Zhetysu players
FC Shakhter Karagandy players
FC Lahti players
Sepsi OSK Sfântu Gheorghe players
FC Voluntari players
KF Feronikeli players
Macedonian First Football League players
Russian Premier League players
Croatian Football League players
Kazakhstan Premier League players
Veikkausliiga players
Liga I players
Football Superleague of Kosovo players
Macedonian expatriate footballers
Macedonian expatriate sportspeople in Russia
Expatriate footballers in Russia
Macedonian expatriate sportspeople in Croatia
Expatriate footballers in Croatia
Macedonian expatriate sportspeople in Kazakhstan
Expatriate footballers in Kazakhstan
Macedonian expatriate sportspeople in Finland
Expatriate footballers in Finland
Macedonian expatriate sportspeople in Romania
Expatriate footballers in Romania
Macedonian expatriate sportspeople in Kosovo
Expatriate footballers in Kosovo